Events from the year 1993 in Russia.

Incumbents
President: Boris Yeltsin
Vice President: Alexander Rutskoy (until 4 October)
Prime Minister: Viktor Chernomyrdin 
Minister of Defence: Pavel Grachev
Minister of Internal Affairs: Viktor Yerin
Chairman of the Supreme Soviet of the Russian Federation: Ruslan Khasbulatov (until October 4)

Events

January
 January 25 - The Russian space station Mir boasts the first art exhibition in outer space.

April
 April 25 - 1993 Russian government referendum

September
 September 21-October 4 - 1993 Russian constitutional crisis

December
 December 12 - 1993 Russian constitutional referendum

Births
January 2 – Kirill Minov, ice dancer
May 1 – Anastasia Belyakova, boxer

Deaths

March 25 – Mikhail Badyuk, World War II aviator (born 1920)

References

 
1990s in Russia
Years of the 20th century in Russia
Russia
Russia
Russia